Tan Jiajie (born 12 January 1997) is a Chinese footballer.

Career statistics

Club

Notes

References

1997 births
Living people
Footballers from Zhaoqing
Footballers from Guangdong
Chinese footballers
Chinese expatriate footballers
Association football midfielders
Serbian First League players
FK Sinđelić Beograd players
Chinese expatriate sportspeople in Serbia
Expatriate footballers in Serbia